The Guildford Owls are a rugby league club based in Guildford, New South Wales, Australia. They have previously competed in the Ron Massey Cup, the Sydney Shield and have also competed in the Sydney Metropolitan Women's Rugby League.

History
Guildford were founded in 1953 although the leagues club at Guildford was founded much earlier in the 1920s.

Guildford have spent much of their existence playing in the lower leagues of the New South Wales Rugby League competitions.  One of Parramatta's greatest ever players, Brett Kenny grew up playing as a Guildford junior.

In 1991, Guildford won the Ron Massey Cup which was then known as the Metropolitan Cup.  In 2018, the Sydney Shield side reached the grand final against East Campbelltown Eagles but were defeated 32-22 at Leichhardt Oval.

Notable players
John Mowbray (1959-68 Western Suburbs)
Brett Kenny (1980-93 Parramatta Eels)
Tim Mannah (2009- Parramatta Eels)
Jon Mannah (2009-12 Parramatta Eels & Cronulla)
Jake Foster (2010-14 Canberra Raiders & Canterbury-Bankstown Bulldogs)
Daniel Tupou (2012- Sydney Roosters)
Manase Fainu (2018- Manly-Warringah Sea Eagles)
Tevita Funa (2020- Manly-Warringah Sea Eagles)

Honours
Ron Massey Cup Winners
1991
Sydney Shield Runners Up
2018

Playing Record in NSWRL Competitions
In three different time-periods, Guildford has entered teams in lower tier competitions run by the New South Wales Rugby League.
The win–loss–draw record in the table below does not include Finals Series matches.

See also

List of rugby league clubs in Australia
Rugby league in New South Wales

Sources

References

External links
 

Rugby league teams in Sydney
Rugby clubs established in 1953
1953 establishments in Australia
Ron Massey Cup